Alias the Champ is a 1949 American crime film directed by George Blair and written by Albert DeMond. The film stars Robert Rockwell, Barbra Fuller, Audrey Long, James Nolan, John Harmon, Sammy Menacker and Joseph Crehan. The film was released on October 15, 1949, by Republic Pictures.

Plot
Lorraine Connors manages the (real-life) wrestler, Gorgeous George. Taking a special interest in George's match is a police lieutenant, Ron Peterson, who is keeping an eye on everybody: mobster Al Merlo, his moll Colette LaRue and another wrestling star, Sammy Menacker, who is dating Lorraine.

A quarrel between the wrestlers erupts and Peterson suggests they settle it in the ring. So much publicity ensues that the match is televised live. Sam is confident he will win, as is Colette, who requests his autograph. Sam is getting the better of George for a while, but is suddenly pinned, defeated and does not get up. He is dead.

George is clearly the prime suspect if this is a murder, while Peterson gets in hot water at the police department for proposing the match in the first place. Merlo is the detective's best guess as the culprit until he views a rebroadcast of the whole evening on TV. He finds the pen Colette used to get Sam's autograph and realizes what happened: It's been poisoned.

Cast    
Robert Rockwell as Police Lt. Ron Peterson
Barbra Fuller as Colette LaRue
Audrey Long as Lorraine Connors
James Nolan as Al Merlo
John Harmon as Chuck Lyons
Sammy Menacker as Sammy Menacker
Joseph Crehan as Tim Murphy
John Hamilton as Police Commissioner Bronson
Stephen Chase as Dist. Atty. Gould
Frank J. Scannell as Bert Tracy
Frank Yaconelli as Headwaiter
Emmett Vogan as Doc Morgan
John Wald as TV Announcer 
Gorgeous George as Gorgeous George
Mike Ruby as Referee
Jimmy Lennon Sr. as Ring Announcer
Henry Kulky as Bomber Kulkovich 
Billy Varga as Wrestler
Bobby Manogoff as Wrestler
George Temple as Wrestler
Tor Johnson as Super Swedish Angel
Jack 'Sockeye' McDonald as Wrestler

References

External links 
 

1949 films
American crime films
1949 crime films
Republic Pictures films
Films directed by George Blair
American black-and-white films
1940s English-language films
1940s American films